Tejay van Garderen (born August 12, 1988) is an American former professional road racing cyclist, who rode professionally between 2008 and 2021 for the , ,  and . Following his retirement as a cyclist, van Garderen became a directeur sportif for UCI WorldTeam .

Early life
Van Garderen was born in Tacoma, Washington, but spent most of his childhood in Bozeman, Montana. His father is Dutch, and he speaks the Dutch language quite well. He won 10 junior national titles on the roads and in cyclo-cross.

Career

Under-23 years (2007–2009)
Van Garderen's first big senior race was at age 18 in the 2007 Tour of California as a part of the national team. He pulled out on stage 4. He rode in the U.S. and in Europe in 2007, and finished 20th in the Tour de l'Avenir.

He lived in the Netherlands and finished second in the Flèche du Sud and Circuito Montañés. He won a stage of the Tour de l'Avenir and finished 24th in the under-23 race at the UCI Road World Championships in Varese, Italy.

Van Garderen joined  the following year.

HTC–Columbia (2010–2011)

2010
Van Garderen came to a team with the most wins in 2009 thanks to prolific sprinters Mark Cavendish and André Greipel. He finished 9th in his first stage race, the Volta ao Algarve, climbing to 5th place on the third stage to the Alto do Malhão summit. In the Tour of Turkey, he came second on two stages and second overall, 29 seconds behind Giovanni Visconti. Van Garderen supported leader Michael Rogers over the 6th and 8th stages of the Tour of California; he finished 28th overall and Rogers won. After nearly upsetting Alberto Contador in the prologue, he came 4th in the Stage 3 time trial to move to 2nd overall. He lost time on mountain stages and finished 3rd. Van Garderen rode a strong Vuelta a España with having a very strong first 2 weeks of the race. His level of performance dropped after that but was still a valuable domestique to Velits, who went on to third place overall in the race.

2011
His strong showing in the Tour of California also earned him the best young rider jersey. He was chosen to be a part of the Tour de France squad. This was van Garderen's first Tour de France and he was riding in support of Tony Martin and Peter Velits. In stage 8, van Garderen won enough points on a Category 2 climb to earn a King of the Mountains jersey and Most Aggressive Rider honors. He was the first American to wear the King of the Mountains jersey in the history of the Tour de France – Greg LeMond briefly led the mountains classification during the 1986 Tour de France, but since he was also the overall leader at the time, he did not wear the mountains jersey. During his dramatic stage 8 ride, he was referred to as the "Bozeman Boss" by commentator Phil Liggett. He would finish in 82nd place. At the Tour of Utah, Van Garderen won the third stage time trial.

BMC Racing Team (2012–2018)

2012

After  was disbanded, Van Garderen joined  along with his  team-mate Marco Pinotti. Van Garderen won the young rider's jersey at Paris–Nice in early March, having held the jersey for the entire race. Van Garderen was selected for the Tour de France as one of the main domestiques for defending champion Cadel Evans. He enjoyed a strong first week, coming fourth in the prologue and wearing the white jersey – for the best-placed rider aged 25 or under in the general classification – until stage 7, where he lost time on the first summit finish of the Tour. He regained the jersey with fourth place on Stage 9, an individual time trial. He proved stronger than Evans on that day, pacing his leader up the final climb. He would go on to finish in fifth place overall while becoming the third American to win the young rider classification, after Greg LeMond in 1984 and Andrew Hampsten in 1986. In August, Van Garderen finished second in the USA Pro Cycling Challenge behind Christian Vande Velde. He had previously won the second stage of the race in a two-man sprint with Vande Velde, earning the yellow jersey in the process. He surrendered the jersey to his fellow countryman the next day, took it back on stage 4 and lost it on stage 6.

2013

Van Garderen opened his 2013 campaign with the Tour de San Luis, where he finished second in the overall standings. He also showed strong appearances as the European cycling season opened in March, finishing Paris–Nice in fourth, and Critérium International in third place. In May, Van Garderen won the first major stage race of his career, the Tour of California. He performed well in all the key stages, coming in second at stage two's hilltop finish, then winning the individual time trial on stage 6. He topped it off by defending the lead on stage 7, a mountaintop finish to Mount Diablo. He somewhat lacked form at the Tour de France, finishing in 45th position. He was part of the breakaway on the eighteenth stage of the race, finishing at Alpe d'Huez, where he finished second behind Christophe Riblon. He then went on to win the USA Pro Cycling Challenge, which included a lot of high altitude racing across Colorado.

2014
Early in 2014 he won stage 4 of the Volta a Catalunya, a summit finish at the Vallter 2000 ski resort. He ultimately finished the race third overall, seven seconds behind race winner Joaquim Rodríguez. The Tour de France started out with hilly parcours in Yorkshire, with van Garderen finishing ninth on the second stage into Sheffield, won by Vincenzo Nibali. After losing two minutes to Nibali on the fifth stage, which included cobbles – to which he disapproved of – van Garderen lost a further minute two days later following a crash. His  also lost domestique Darwin Atapuma, who suffered a broken leg in the same crash. Over the remainder of the race, van Garderen placed sixth or higher on five stages, and ultimately finished fifth overall, as the race reached its conclusion in Paris. He repeated his success of the previous year at the USA Pro Cycling Challenge, winning the general classification and two stages, and finished the season with a gold medal in the team time trial at the UCI Road World Championships.

2015
In 2015, van Garderen started his season at the Tour of Oman, where he took second place behind Rafael Valls. He earned his first victory of the year on the fourth stage of the Volta a Catalunya, which was the queen stage. However, he was too far down in the overall standings to affect the general classification. In June, he rode the Critérium du Dauphiné as a preparation for the Tour de France. He battled with Chris Froome who edged him in the overall classification by ten seconds and finished second. In spite of a strong first two weeks, he abandoned the Tour de France during Stage 17 due to illness a day after the second rest day. At the time of his abandon, he was in third place overall.

2016–2018
He chose to not attend the 2016 Summer Olympics over concerns of the zika virus.

He was named in the start list for the 2017 Giro d'Italia. He won stage 18, marking his first stage victory in a Grand Tour. His 2017 Vuelta a España got off to a good start with the  winning the opening stage, a team time trial. Van Garderen ultimately recorded a 10th-place finish in the general classification, his third top-ten finish at a Grand Tour.

During the 2018 Tour de France he was involved in a rare tie for the Yellow Jersey following a team time trial, which Team BMC won. As there had not yet been an individual time trial to measure rider times to a 1,000th of a second his teammate Greg Van Avermaet was awarded the overall race lead due to his higher finishes within the peloton during the previous stages.

EF Education First (2019–2021)
At the Tour of California, he wore the leader's jersey for a few stages and finished 9th. He then performed well in the Critérium du Dauphiné finishing on the podium in 2nd place overall.

Prior to the COVID-19 pandemic, van Garderen intended to target the Giro d'Italia and the Tour de France in 2020.

He announced he would retire after the 2021 United States National Road Race Championships.

Major results

2005
 National Junior Road Championships
2nd Road race
3rd Time trial
2006
 1st  Time trial, National Junior Road Championships
2008
 1st Stage 5 (TTT) Volta a Lleida
 2nd Overall Flèche du Sud
1st Stage 2
 2nd Overall Circuito Montañés
 4th Overall Grand Prix Guillaume Tell
1st Stage 4
 8th Overall Tour de l'Avenir
1st Stage 9
2009
 1st  Overall Tour du Haut-Anjou
 1st  Overall Circuito Montañés
 2nd Overall Tour des Pays de Savoie
 2nd Overall Tour de l'Avenir
 3rd Time trial, National Under-23 Road Championships
 3rd Overall Olympia's Tour
1st Prologue (TTT) & Stage 5
 6th Overall Istrian Spring Trophy
 7th De Vlaamse Pijl
2010
 1st Stage 1 (TTT) Vuelta a España
 2nd Overall Tour of Turkey
 3rd Overall Critérium du Dauphiné
 4th Overall Tour de l'Ain
1st  Young rider classification
 9th Overall Volta ao Algarve
2011
 1st Stage 3 (ITT) Tour of Utah
 2nd Overall Volta ao Algarve
 3rd Overall USA Pro Cycling Challenge
1st  Young rider classification
 5th Overall Tour of California
1st  Young rider classification
Tour de France
 Combativity award Stage 8
Held  after Stage 8
2012
 UCI Road World Championships
2nd  Team time trial
4th Time trial
 2nd Time trial, National Road Championships
 2nd Overall USA Pro Cycling Challenge
1st Stage 2
 4th Overall Tour of California
 5th Overall Tour de France
1st  Young rider classification
 5th Overall Paris–Nice
1st  Young rider classification
 7th Overall Volta ao Algarve
2013
 1st  Overall Tour of California
1st Stage 6 (ITT)
 1st  Overall USA Pro Cycling Challenge
1st Stage 5 (ITT)
 2nd Overall Tour de San Luis
 3rd Overall Critérium International
1st  Young rider classification
 4th Overall Paris–Nice
 7th Overall Tour de Suisse
2014
 1st  Team time trial, UCI Road World Championships
 1st  Overall USA Pro Cycling Challenge
1st Stages 3 & 6 (ITT)
 2nd Overall Tour of Oman
 3rd Overall Volta a Catalunya
1st Stage 4
 5th Overall Tour de France
 6th Overall Tour of the Basque Country
2015
 1st Stage 9 (TTT) Tour de France
 1st Stage 1 (TTT) Vuelta a España
 1st Stage 4 Volta a Catalunya
 2nd Overall Tour of Oman
 2nd Overall Critérium du Dauphiné
1st Stage 3 (TTT)
2016
 1st Stage 1 (TTT) Tirreno–Adriatico
 2nd Overall Vuelta a Andalucía
1st Stage 4 (ITT)
 5th Overall Volta a Catalunya
 6th Overall Tour de Suisse
1st Stage 7
 7th Vuelta a Murcia
 10th Overall Tour de Romandie
2017
 1st Stage 18 Giro d'Italia
 1st Stage 1 (TTT) Tirreno–Adriatico
 2nd  Team time trial, UCI Road World Championships
 5th Overall Volta a Catalunya
1st Stage 2 (TTT)
 6th Overall Tour de Romandie
 10th Overall Vuelta a España
1st Stage 1 (TTT)
2018
 1st Prologue Tour of Utah
 1st Stage 3 (TTT) Tour de France
 1st Stage 1 (TTT) Tour de Suisse
 2nd Overall Tour of California
1st Stage 4 (ITT)
 3rd  Team time trial, UCI Road World Championships
 3rd Overall Volta ao Algarve
 8th Tour du Finistère
2019
 2nd Overall Critérium du Dauphiné
 9th Overall Tour of California
2020
 1st Stage 1 (TTT) Tour Colombia
2021
 3rd Time trial, National Road Championships

General classification results timeline

References

External links

 
 
 
 
 
 
 
 

1988 births
Living people
American male cyclists
American people of Dutch descent
Sportspeople from Tacoma, Washington
Olympic cyclists of the United States
Cyclists at the 2012 Summer Olympics
UCI Road World Champions (elite men)
American Giro d'Italia stage winners
Cyclists from Washington (state)
Tour de Suisse stage winners